Koose (also known as Bean Cake) is a spicy black-eyed pea fritter that is commonly eaten in West Africa as a snack.

It was introduced to West Africa by the Hausa people of Northern Nigeria and other parts of West Africa such as the northern region of Ghana, Sierra Leone and Cameroon. Koose can also be found in Caribbean countries such as Cuba and in South American countries such as Brazil. It is known in Ghana as "koose" or "koosay", in Nigeria as "akara", in Brazil as "acaraje" and in Cuba as "bollitos de carita". To the Dagbamba of Ghana it is known as "Kooshe", the Ewe call it "agawu" and to some in the Zongo community as "koose tankuwa".

Nutrition 
Koose contains fiber, antioxidants, and protein from the black-eyed peas.

References 

Nigerian cuisine
Ghanaian cuisine
Sierra Leonean cuisine
Cameroonian cuisine
Cuban cuisine
Snack foods
Legume dishes
Fritters